Art Sanders is a news anchor for KNX (AM)  in Los Angeles, California.

He previously spent 22 years with KNWN (AM) in Seattle, Washington (state) working primarily as the weekday evening anchor. His tenure with the station pre-dated the switch to the All-News Radio format in September 2002.

In 2004, he auditioned for the announcer's spot on television's longest running game show, The Price Is Right, after the death of Rod Roddy.

References

External links
Official Bio

American radio news anchors
Game show announcers
Radio personalities from Seattle
Living people
Year of birth missing (living people)